Moronic acid (3-oxoolean-18-en-28-oic acid) is a natural triterpene.  Moronic acid can be extracted from Rhus javanica, a sumac plant traditionally believed to hold medicinal applications.  The molecule has also been extracted from mistletoe (Phoradendron reichenbachianum).

Bevirimat, a derivative of the related triterpenoid betulinic acid, is under development as an anti-HIV drug; however, moronic acid has shown better antiviral profiles in vitro than bevirimat. A particular moronic acid derivative showed potent anti-HIV activity with EC50 values of 0.0085 μM against NL4-3, 0.021 μM against PI-R (a multiple protease inhibitor resistant strain), and 0.13 μM against FHR-2 (an HIV strain resistant to (bevirimat).  This derivative has become a new lead for clinical trials and is also active against herpes simplex virus 1.

References

External links
 CTD's Moronic acid page from the Comparative Toxicogenomics Database
 NLM/NIH Medical Subject Heading
 KEGG Terpenoid Synthesis Pathway
 Molecules with silly names

Triterpenes
Keto acids